The National Cyber Investigative Joint Task Force (NCIJTF) was officially established in 2008. The NCIJTF comprises over 20 partnering agencies from across law enforcement, the intelligence community, and the Department of Defense, with representatives who are co-located and work jointly to accomplish the organization's mission.

Since 2008, NCIJTF has been the primary American agency responsible for coordinating cyber threats investigations, and liaisons with the Central Intelligence Agency (CIA), Department of Defense (DOD), Department of Homeland Security (DHS), and National Security Agency (NSA).

As a multi-agency cyber center, the NCIJTF coordinates, integrates, and shares information to support cyber threat investigations, supply and support intelligence analysis for community decision-makers, and support other efforts in the fight against cyber threats. The task force uses the collective resources of its members and collaborates with international and private sector partners to bring all available resources to bear against domestic cyber threats and their perpetrators.

References

External links 
 National Cyber Investigative Joint Task Force

Federal law enforcement agencies of the United States
2008 establishments in the United States
Computer security organizations
Federal Bureau of Investigation